William Henry Sinclair, (February 8, 1864 – September 27, 1902) was a Canadian politician. He served on the Legislative Assembly of the Northwest Territories for Saskatoon in 1902.

He was elected in 1902 to the Legislative Assembly of the Northwest Territories, and served until his death on September 27, 1902 in a hunting accident which he accidentally shot himself while stowing his gun away.

Electoral results

1902 election

References

1864 births
1902 deaths
Members of the Legislative Assembly of the Northwest Territories
People from Ontario
20th-century Canadian politicians
Hunting accident deaths
Deaths by firearm in Saskatchewan
Accidental deaths in Saskatchewan
Firearm accident victims